The 2022–23 season is the 73rd in the history of Olympique Lyonnais and their 34th consecutive season in the top flight. The club are participating in Ligue 1 and the Coupe de France.

Players

Squad information
Players and squad numbers last updated on 17 Mars 2023. Appearances include Ligue 1, Coupe de France, Coupe de la Ligue, Trophée des Champions, UEFA Champions League and UEFA Europa League matches.Note: Flags indicate national team as has been defined under FIFA eligibility rules. Players may hold more than one non-FIFA nationality.

Players from Olympique Lyonnais Reserves and Academy

Transfers

In

Out

Transfer summary

Spending

Summer:  €9,450,000

Winter:  €21,000,000

Total:  €30,450,000

Income

Summer:  €46,350,000

Winter:  €37,500,000

Total:  €78,850,000

Net Expenditure

Summer:  €36,900,000

Winter:  €16,500,000

Total:  €53,400,000

Pre-season and friendlies 

Lyon started the pre-season on 1 July. Following the pause of Ligue 1 with the 2022 FIFA World Cup taking place, the club returned to training on 25 November, with the participation of players who were not at the World Cup.

Competitions

Overall record

Ligue 1

League table

Results summary

Results by round

Matches
The league fixtures were announced on 17 June 2022.

Coupe de France

Statistics

Appearances and goals

|-
! colspan=14 style="background:#0000FF; color:white; text-align:center| Goalkeepers

|-
! colspan=14 style="background:#0000FF; color:white; text-align:center| Defenders

|-
! colspan=14 style="background:#0000FF; color:white; text-align:center| Midfielders

|-
! colspan=14 style="background:#0000FF; color:white; text-align:center| Forwards

|-
! colspan=14 style="background:#0000FF; color:white; text-align:center| Players transferred out during the season

Goalscorers

References

Olympique Lyonnais seasons
Olympique Lyonnais